KCMS may refer to:

KCMS, a radio station (105.3 FM) licensed to Edmonds, Washington, United States
King's College Music Society, of King's College, Cambridge
Kent County Medical Society, Michigan, United States
Kalamazoo Center for Medical Studies, Kalamazoo, Michigan, United States